Horace Parlan (January 19, 1931 – February 23, 2017) was an American pianist and composer known for working in the hard bop and post-bop styles of jazz. In addition to his work as a bandleader Parlan was known for his contributions to the Charles Mingus recordings Mingus Ah Um and Blues & Roots.

Early life
He was born in Pittsburgh, Pennsylvania, United States. In his birth year, Parlan was stricken with polio, resulting in the partial crippling of his right hand. The handicap contributed to his development of a particularly "pungent" left-hand chord voicing style, while comping with highly rhythmic phrases with the right.

Later life and career
Between 1952 and 1957, he worked in Washington D.C. with Sonny Stitt, then spent two years with Mingus' Jazz Workshop.  In 1973, Parlan moved to Copenhagen, Denmark. He later settled in the small village of Rude in southern Zealand. In 1974, he completed a State Department tour of Africa with Hal Singer.

His later work, such as a series of duos with the tenor saxophonist Archie Shepp included the album Goin' Home (1977), steeped in gospel music.

Parlan received the 2000 Ben Webster Prize awarded by the Ben Webster Foundation.

He died at a nursing home in Naestved, Denmark at the age of 86. He had been suffering from multiple ailments, including diabetes and failing eyesight.

Discography

As leader/co-leader

Documentary, released on DVD: Horace Parlan by Horace Parlan
 
Main source:

As sideman

With Dave Bailey
 One Foot in the Gutter (Epic, 1960)
 Gettin' Into Somethin' (Epic, 1961) – recorded in 1960

With Eddie "Lockjaw" Davis
 Goin' to the Meeting (Prestige, 1961) – recorded in 1960
 Tough Tenor Favorites (Jazzland, 1962) also with Johnny Griffin
 Jaw's Blues (Enja, 1981)

With Lou Donaldson
 The Time Is Right (Blue Note, 1959)
 Sunny Side Up (Blue Note, 1960)
 Midnight Sun (Blue Note, 1980) – recorded in 1960

With Booker Ervin
 That's It! (Candid, 1961)
 Exultation! (Prestige, 1963)

With Dexter Gordon
 Doin' Allright (Blue Note, 1961)
 Stable Mable (SteepleChase, 1975)

With Slide Hampton
 Jazz with a Twist (Atlantic, 1962) – recorded in 1961
 Explosion! The Sound of Slide Hampton (Atlantic, 1962)

With Roland Kirk
 Gifts & Messages (Mercury, 1964)
 I Talk with the Spirits (Limelight, 1965) – recorded in 1964
 Slightly Latin (Limelight, 1965)

With Charles Mingus
 A Modern Jazz Symposium of Music and Poetry (Bethlehem, 1957)
 Mingus Ah Um (Columbia, 1959)
 Blues & Roots (Atlantic, 1960) – recorded in 1959

With Doug Raney
I'll Close My Eyes (SteepleChase, 1982)
Meeting the Tenors (Criss Cross, 1983) – recorded in 1984

With Archie Shepp
 Splashes (L+R, 1987)
 Black Ballads (Timeless, 1992)

With Idrees Sulieman
 Bird's Grass (SteepleChase, 1985) – recorded in 1976
 Groovin' (SteepleChase, 1986) – recorded in 1985

With Stanley Turrentine
 Look Out! (Blue Note, 1960)
 Up at "Minton's" (Blue Note, 1961)
 Salt Song (CTI, 1971)
 Comin' Your Way (Blue Note, 1987) – recorded in 1961

With others
 Gene Ammons, Gene Ammons in Sweden (Enja, 1981) – recorded in 1973
 Al Cohn and Zoot Sims, Motoring Along (Sonet, 1975)
 Johnny Coles, New Morning (Criss Cross Jazz, 1982)
 Pierre Dorge, The Jazzpar Prize (Enja, 1992)
 Frank Foster, The House That Love Built (SteepleChase, 1982)
 Hugo Heredia, Mananita Pampera (Cote d'azur, 1976)
 Langston Hughes, Weary Blues (MGM, 1958)
 Tommy Turrentine, Tommy Turrentine (Time, 1960)
 Kai Winding and Curtis Fuller, Giant Bones '80 (Sonet, 1980)
 various artists, A Moon of Roses

References

External links
BBC World Service - A Portrait of Horace Parlan
Horace Parlan Hardbop Homepage
[ Biography at AllMusic]
Article at All About Jazz
Soul Note Catalogue
Horace Parlan -Pittsburgh Music History

1931 births
2017 deaths
American jazz pianists
American male pianists
Hard bop pianists
Musicians from Pittsburgh
Post-bop pianists
SteepleChase Records artists
Enja Records artists
Blue Note Records artists
People with polio
Jazz musicians from Pennsylvania
American male jazz musicians